Bereznyagi is a rural locality (a selo) and the administrative center of Bereznyagovskoye Rural Settlement, Petropavlovsky District, Voronezh Oblast, Russia. The population was 773 as of 2010. There are 5 streets.

Geography 
Bereznyagi is located 21 km southeast of Petropavlovka (the district's administrative centre) by road. Novobogoroditskoye is the nearest rural locality.

References 

Rural localities in Petropavlovsky District, Voronezh Oblast